Andrea Zinali (born 3 September 1969) is an Italian windsurfer. He competed in the men's Mistral One Design event at the 1996 Summer Olympics.

References

External links
 

1969 births
Living people
Italian windsurfers
Italian male sailors (sport)
Olympic sailors of Italy
Sailors at the 1996 Summer Olympics – Mistral One Design
People from Piombino
Sportspeople from the Province of Livorno